Albert Madörin (March 17, 1905 – June 1960) was a Swiss bobsledder who competed in the early 1950s. He won a bronze medal in the four-man event at the 1952 Winter Olympics in Oslo. Madörin also won a silver medal in the four-man event at the 1950 FIBT World Championships in Cortina d'Ampezzo.

References

Bobsleigh four-man Olympic medalists for 1924, 1932-56, and since 1964
Bobsleigh four-man world championship medalists since 1930

1905 births
1960 deaths
Bobsledders at the 1952 Winter Olympics
Olympic bobsledders of Switzerland
Olympic bronze medalists for Switzerland
Swiss male bobsledders
Olympic medalists in bobsleigh
Medalists at the 1952 Winter Olympics